In Māori mythology, Ikaroa is the long fish that gave birth to all the stars in the Milky Way or the Mother Goddess of all the stars – ornaments of the Sky God. Ika-Roa is also an alternative name for the Milky Way. 

Ika-roa was also called Mangōroa ("long shark") or Mangōroa i ata ("long shark in the early dawn").

Notes

References
 E. Shortland, Maori Religion and Mythology (Longmans: London), 1882. 
 E.R. Tregear, Maori-Polynesian Comparative Dictionary (Lyon and Blair: Lambton Quay), 1891.

Māori mythology
Fish deities